LaBelle Municipal Airport  is a public-use airport located  south of the central business district of the city of LaBelle in Hendry County, Florida, United States. The airport is publicly owned.

References

External links

Airports in Florida
Transportation buildings and structures in Hendry County, Florida